The 2000 Norwegian Football Cup Final was the final match of the 2000 Norwegian Football Cup, the 95th season of the Norwegian Football Cup, the premier Norwegian football cup competition organized by the Football Association of Norway (NFF). The match was played on 29 October 2000 at the Ullevaal Stadion in Oslo, and opposed two Tippeligaen sides Odd Grenland and Viking. Odd Grenland defeated Viking 2–1 after extra time to claim the Norwegian Cup for a twelfth time in their history.

Match

Details

References

2000
Viking FK matches
Odds BK matches
Football Cup
Sports competitions in Oslo
October 2000 sports events in Europe
2000s in Oslo